In modern portfolio theory, the efficient frontier (or portfolio frontier) is an investment portfolio which occupies the "efficient" parts of the risk–return spectrum. 
Formally, it is the set of portfolios which satisfy the condition that no other portfolio exists with a higher expected return but with the same standard deviation of return (i.e., the risk). 
The efficient frontier was first formulated by Harry Markowitz in 1952; 
see Markowitz model.

Overview

A combination of assets, i.e. a portfolio, is referred to as "efficient" if it has the best possible expected level of return for its level of risk (which is represented by the standard deviation of the portfolio's return).  Here, every possible combination of risky assets can be plotted in risk–expected return space, and the collection of all such possible portfolios defines a region in this space. In the absence of the opportunity to hold a risk-free asset, this region is the opportunity set (the feasible set). The positively sloped (upward-sloped) top boundary of this  region is a portion of a hyperbola and is called the "efficient frontier".  

If a risk-free asset is also available, the opportunity set is larger, and its upper boundary, the efficient frontier, is a straight line segment emanating from the vertical axis at the value of the risk-free asset's return and tangent to the risky-assets-only opportunity set. All portfolios between the risk-free asset and the tangency portfolio are portfolios composed of risk-free assets and the tangency portfolio, while all portfolios on the linear frontier above and to the right of the tangency portfolio are generated by borrowing at the risk-free rate and investing the proceeds into the tangency portfolio.

See also
Markowitz model
Modern portfolio theory
Critical line method, an optimization algorithm developed by Markowitz for this problem

References

Financial economics
Finance theories
Mathematical finance
Portfolio theories

Théorie moderne du portefeuille